Provident Financial Services, Inc. is the holding company for Provident Bank. Established in 1839, Provident Bank emphasizes personal service and customer convenience in attending to the financial needs of businesses, individuals and families in New Jersey, New York, and eastern Pennsylvania. The bank offers a broad array of deposit, loan, and investment products as well as trust, fiduciary and wealth management services through its wholly owned subsidiary, Beacon Trust Company. 

Provident Bank is currently the third largest bank headquartered in NJ by deposit market share and the oldest community bank in New Jersey.

Corporate history
The Provident Institution for Savings was originally chartered by the State of New Jersey in 1839, becoming the first mutual savings bank in the history of the state. The first President was John F. Ellis from 1839 to 1841. Co-founder Dudley S. Gregory became President in 1841 and held the job until his retirement in 1874. Due to the general public mistrust of banks resulting from the Panic of 1837, it did not accept its first deposit of $227 until October 16, 1843. The Provident was run out of a room in Jersey City's Temperance Hall until moving to the office of Treasurer Peter Bentley in 1846. By 1875, Provident had assets of $3.5 million.

A run on the bank occurred on May 12, 1882 following the attempted suicide of Edmund W. Kingsland, the bank's Treasurer, in his office. The run on the bank ceased when an independent audit proved all accounts were in order. Kingsland survived the suicide attempt.

In 1989, The Provident Savings Bank celebrated its 150th anniversary.

Acquisition of The First National Bank of Dunellen
In 1978, Provident acquired the First National Bank of Dunellen. This was a pioneering move. No one had ever heard of a savings bank buying out a commercial bank. When the deal was complete, however, Provident had increased its assets by $20 million and added two new branch offices – Dunellen and Green Brook.

Merger with Bloomfield Savings Bank
Controlled growth solidified Provident’s status as a stalwart financial institution. A landmark event in the history of both Provident and its neighboring competitor Bloomfield Savings Institution was marked in 1983 when they announced a merger that would create a billion-dollar plus bank.

Team Capital
In 2014, Provident merged with Team Capital.

SB One Bank acquisition
In March 2020, Provident announced its intention to acquire SB One Bank (formerly Sussex Bank) for $208.9 million. The deal closed on July 31, 2020.

Lakeland Bank acquisition
In September 2022, Provident announced that they agreed to acquire Lakeland Bancorp, Inc.(), bank holding company for Lakeland Bank, based in Oak Ridge, New Jersey, for approximately $1.3 billion.  The deal is expected to close in the second quarter of 2023.

See also
Provident Institution for Sav. v. Mayor of Jersey City

References

Companies listed on the New York Stock Exchange
Banks based in New Jersey
Companies based in Jersey City, New Jersey
Banks established in 1839
American companies established in 1839